Dalam is a 2013 Telugu-Tamil bilingual action thriller film by debutant director B. Jeevan Reddy, a protégé of noted Indian director Ram Gopal Varma. The Telugu version Dalam was produced by M. Sumanth Kumar Reddy under the banner of Mammoth Media & Entertainment and released in the first week of 15 August 2013, while Koottam, the Tamil version, was released in 2014. The film starring Naveen Chandra, Piaa Bajpai, Nassar, Abhimanyu Singh, and Kishore tells the story of a group of former naxals and their struggles against the police and politicians when they start their lives afresh from Jail.

Plot
The scene begins in a Naxal-infested area, where a gun battle is ensuing between state policeman and Naxals. In the battle, the Naxals lose many men. They decide to forgo their pursuit of war and hand themselves to the government. During their time in jail, they undergo many tortures, but then one of the jail's seniors offers the Naxals to switch sides to the police and do hit jobs.

Cast

Naveen Chandra as Abhi
Piaa Bajpai as Shruthi
Nassar as JK
Kishore as Satruvu
Abhimanyu Singh as Ladda
Krishnudu as Bhadram
Subbaraju
Pragathi
Mahadevan
Ajay
Thagubothu Ramesh
Dhanraj
Harsha Vardhan
Saikumar
Nathalia Kaur as Item Number

Production
The film began pre-production in early 2012 with Piaa Bajpai in the role of love interest to Naveen Chandra, the male lead in the film. Chandra had already filmed Therodum Veedhiyile in Tamil. Actors Kishore, Nasser and Saikumar play important roles in the film. James Vasanthan has scored the music. Each scene was shot twice, for a Tamil and Telugu version.

Soundtrack
The music was composed by James Vasanthan.

Release
The Telugu version of the film released in August 2013 released to average reviews, with a critic noting "it's a decently directed movie, and the story flows neatly for the most part" and that "despite its violent content, the film is not as loud as it is thought-provoking. The film is also suitably intriguing." The Tamil version of the film released in April 2014 with Malini Mannath of The New Indian Express writing that "Koottam has a plot with the potential to turn into a riveting thriller. It would probably have, had the screenplay been more coherent and focused".

References

Indian multilingual films
2013 films
2013 action thriller films
Films scored by James Vasanthan
2010s Tamil-language films
2010s Telugu-language films
Films about Naxalism
Indian action thriller films
Indian gangster films
2013 multilingual films
2013 directorial debut films